Lingga Island is the largest and most populated of the Lingga Islands, Indonesia. It is located south of the Riau Islands off the east coast of Sumatra. The other major island of the archipelago is Singkep.

Lingga Islands